Alberta Provincial Highway No. 36, commonly referred to as Highway 36 and officially named Veterans Memorial Highway, is a north-south highway in eastern Alberta, Canada that extends from Highway 4 near Warner to Highway 55 in Lac La Biche. Lac La Biche County is lobbying the Government of Alberta to renumber Highway 881 to Highway 36 from Lac La Biche north to Highway 63 south of Fort McMurray.

Major intersections 
From south to north:

Footnotes

References 

036
Monuments and memorials in Alberta
Taber, Alberta